Rolf Zachariassen (born 27 June 1935) is a Finnish sailor. He competed in the Star event at the 1960 Summer Olympics.

References

External links
 

1935 births
Living people
Finnish male sailors (sport)
Olympic sailors of Finland
Sailors at the 1960 Summer Olympics – Star
Sportspeople from Helsinki